is the 23rd single by Japanese entertainer Miho Nakayama. Written by Mika Watanabe and Hideya Nakazaki, the single was released on November 1, 1991, by King Records.

Background and release
"Tōi Machi no Doko ka de..." is a Christmas song used as the theme song of the Fuji TV drama series , which also starred Nakayama. Like the drama, the song is themed on long-distance relationships. As of 2019, it was used by USEN Corporation as one of the company's background songs during the Christmas season.

"Tōi Machi no Doko ka de..." became Nakayama's sixth straight No. 3 on Oricon's weekly singles chart. It sold over 673,000 copies and was certified Platinum by the RIAJ, becoming her biggest-selling single until "Sekaijū no Dare Yori Kitto" a year later.

Track listing

Charts
Weekly charts

Year-end charts

Certification

References

External links

1991 singles
1991 songs
Japanese-language songs
Japanese Christmas songs
Japanese television drama theme songs
Miho Nakayama songs
King Records (Japan) singles